The frilled coquette (Lophornis magnificus) is a species of hummingbird in the "coquettes", tribe Lesbiini of subfamily Lesbiinae. It is endemic to Brazil.

Taxonomy and systematics

The frilled coquette's genus name derives from the Greek words "lophos λοφος"meaning "crest, tuft, forelock" and "ornis ορνις", " meaning bird. The species name "magnificus" is the Latin word for "magnificent, splendid".

The frilled coquette is monotypic.

Description

The frilled coquette is one of the smallest birds alive. Both sexes have a short, straight, black-tipped red bill and bronzy green upperparts with a white band across the rump. Adult males of this striking bird have a long, rufous-orange erectile crest and green and white fan-shaped cheek feathers. Its forehead and throat are iridescent green and the rest of the underparts grayish green. Its central tail feathers are bronzy green and the rest rufous with bronzy green tips and edges. The adult female does not have the male's crest or cheek tufts. It has a whitish throat with rufous discs and dark crescents. It underparts are grayish green like the male's, but the tail is overall dark bronze with rufous ends. Juveniles are similar to the adult female.

Distribution and habitat

The frilled coquette is found in eastern and southern Brazil, from Espírito Santo south to Rio Grande do Sul and west almost to Bolivia and Paraguay. It has occasionally been recorded as far north as Alagoas. It inhabits semi-open to open landscapes such as the edges of humid forest, secondary forest, coffee plantations, gardens, and cerrado.

Behavior

Movement

The frilled coquette makes some seasonal dispersal, apparently after the flowering and nesting season.

Feeding

The frilled coquette feeds on small arthropods and on the nectar of a wide variety of small flowering plants. It defers to larger hummingbirds.

Breeding

The frilled coquette's breeding season spans from August to March. The female makes a cup-shaped nest of plant down and moss decorated with lichens on the outside. The female incubates the clutch of two white eggs; incubation lasts 12 to 13 days and fledging occurs about 20 days after hatch.

Vocal and non-vocal sounds

The frilled coquette is mostly silent. It gives "a short 'tsip'" while feeding. Its wings make "a low bee-like humming" when hovering.

Status

The IUCN has assessed the frilled coquette as being of Least Concern, though its population size and trend are not known. It is regarded as common and "[r]eadily accepts man-made habitats like plantations and flowering gardens". It occurs in several protected areas.

Gallery

References

Further reading

Rolf Karl Heinz Grantsau: Die Kolibris Brasiliens. Expressão e Cultura, Rio de Janeiro 1988, .
Das große Weltreich der Tiere. Übersetzung aus dem Englischen, S. 278, 279, Hrsg. Philip Withfield, Verlag: Planet Medien AG, Zug 1992, 
Louis Jean Pierre Vieillot: Nouveau dictionnaire d'histoire naturelle, appliquée aux arts, à l'agriculture, à l'économie rurale et domestique, à la médecine, etc. Par une société de naturalistes et d'agriculteurs. Bd. 7, Deterville, Paris 1817 (Online Biodiversity Heritage Libraries).

frilled coquette
Birds of Brazil
Endemic birds of Brazil
Hummingbird species of South America
frilled coquette
Taxa named by Louis Jean Pierre Vieillot
Taxonomy articles created by Polbot